Dierna was a fort in the Roman province of Dacia, located in the territory of the present-day town of Orșova.

See also
List of castra

External links
Roman castra from Romania - Google Maps / Earth

Notes

Roman Dacia
Archaeological sites in Romania
Roman legionary fortresses in Romania
History of Banat